Claudio Pistolesi (born 25 August 1967) is a former professional Italian tennis player.

Pistolesi's highest ATP singles ranking is World No. 71, which he reached in August 1987. His career high in doubles was at World No. 213 in November 1986.

In December 2010, he became the coach of Robin Söderling. He has helped Söderling to win a title in the beginning of 2011, Brisbane, Australia. In 2012, he coached Daniela Hantuchová.

He has also been a member of the ATP Player Council as a coach since 2010, having been re-elected in 2012 and 2016.

Career finals

Singles (1 win)

References

External links
 
 
 Pistolesi Tennis Academy An Academy he's running.

1967 births
Living people
Italian male tennis players
Tennis players from Rome
Italian tennis coaches
20th-century Italian people